Hideshi Hino (日野日出志 Hino Hideshi, born April 19, 1946) is a Japanese manga artist who specializes in horror stories. His comics include Hell Baby, Hino Horrors, and Panorama of Hell. He also wrote and directed two entries in the Guinea Pig series of horror films: Flower of Flesh and Blood (1985), and Mermaid in a Manhole (1988).

Biography
Hideshi Hino was born in Qiqihar to Japanese immigrant workers in Japanese-occupied Northeast China just when Japan surrendered at the end of World War II to the invading Soviet forces. His family escaped to Japan fearing retribution from Chinese civilians, so his town gathered up everybody and started to make their move to the remaining internationally governed harbours.

Hino has claimed that he was nearly killed en route to Japan by his fellow townspeople during the evacuation from China.
Some of his manga have been based on his life and its events; for example, his grandfather was a Yakuza and his father used to be a pig farmer with a spider tattoo on his back. Hino has depicted these in his manga many times (as in Panorama of Hell).

Although originally considering a job in the film industry, the works of manga artists Shigeru Sugiura and Yoshiharu Tsuge inspired the young Hino to express himself in the medium of manga instead. He originally began in doujinshi, and his first professional work, the short story Tsumetai Ase, was published in Osamu Tezuka's experimental manga magazine COM in 1967. From 1968 on, he published in the alternative manga magazine Garo. With the serialized "Hideshi Hino's Shocking Theater" coming out in 1971, his bizarre world of deviant killers, grotesque beasts, and decaying corpses was firmly established.

He found a large following in the world of shojo manga. Works such as Dead Little Girl and Ghost School were prominently featured in shojo magazines.

In 2004, Pony Canyon made a series of six live action films, based on his manga, called Hideshi Hino's Theater of Horror.

One of Hino's hobbies is maintaining Japanese swords. He is also a practitioner of Budō.

Works
Tsumetai Ase (つめたい汗), 1967, published in COM
Sabu no Machi (恐怖! 四次元の町 - サブの町), 1977-1978, published in Weekly Shōnen Magazine
Hell Baby (恐怖・地獄少女, Kyofu Jigoku Shōjo), 1982
The Hino Horror series:
Hino Horror Volume 1: The Red Snake (赤い蛇 Akai Hebi) (1983, one shot). Published in France as Serpent Rouge by Éditions IMHO .
Hino Horror Volume 2: The Bug Boy (毒虫小僧 Dokumushi Kozō) (1975, one shot). Published in France as L'Enfant Insecte by Éditions IMHO in November 2010.
Hino Horror Volume 3-4: Oninbo and the Bugs from Hell (地獄虫を食う! 鬼んぼ Jigoku Mushi Woku! Oninbo) (2 vol.).
Hino Horror Volume 5: The Living Corpse (死肉の男 Shiniku no Otoko) (1986, one shot).
Hino Horror Volume 6: Black Cat (黒猫の眼が闇に Kuro Neko no Megayamini)
Hino Horror Volume 7-8: The Collection (Mコレクション M Collection) (1995-1996, 2 vol., published in Horror M
Hino Horror Volume 9: Ghost School
Hino Horror Volume 10: Death's Reflection
Hino Horror Volume 11: Gallery of Horrors (恐怖ギャラリー Kyōfu Gallery) (1998, one shot).
Hino Horror Volume 12: Mystique Mandala of Hell (怪奇!地獄まんだら Kaiki! Jigoku Mandara) (1982, one shot).
Hino Horror Volume 13: Zipangu Night (ジパングナイト) (1997, one shot).
Hino Horror Volume 14: Skin And Bone
Hino Horror Volume 15: The Experiment
Hino Horror Volume 16: Who's That Girl?
Comics Underground Japan (short story Laughing Ball)
The Art of Hideshi Hino
Genshoku no kotō. Bokura no sensei (幻色の孤島（ぼくらの先生）) (1972, one shot). Published in Spain as La isla de las pesadillas.
Zōroku no Kibyō (蔵六の奇病) (1976, one shot). Published in Spain as La enfermedad de Zoroku.
Lullabies from Hell (地獄の子守唄) (1977, one shot).
City of Pigs (ブタの町, Buta no Machi) (1983)
 (1984, one shot). Published in France as Panorama de l'enfer by Éditions IMHO . Published in Italy as Visioni d'Inferno by Telemaco Comics.
Circus Kitan (サーカス奇譚) (1991, one shot). Published in Spain as Circo de monstruos.
Masterpiece of the bizarre (怪奇傑作選 Kaiki kessakusen) (2015, one shot). Published in Spain as Historias de la máscara by Ediciones La Cúpula, S.L.

Filmography

References

External links

Hideshi Hino, Reviews and Critique at The Open Critic

Manga artists
Japanese horror writers
Living people
Japanese film directors
1946 births
Japanese screenwriters